The Joe Pell Building, also known as The Hub, on Pell St. in Lewisport, Kentucky, was listed on the National Register of Historic Places in 1984.

It was deemed significant as "the only intact late 19th century wood frame commercial building in Lewisport, and one of few which
exist, intact in the state. It is a fine representative example of a once popular vernacular commercial building."

The building is no longer on the site.

References

Commercial buildings on the National Register of Historic Places in Kentucky
National Register of Historic Places in Hancock County, Kentucky
Former buildings and structures in Kentucky